Toto is a Unicode block containing characters for Dhaniram Toto's script for writing the Toto language of in northeast India.

History
The following Unicode-related documents record the purpose and process of defining specific characters in the Toto block:

References 

Unicode blocks